Best Kind of Mess is the debut studio album by American rock band Get Scared, released in the United States on July 12, 2011 through Universal Motown Records. The album was preceded by singles "Fail", "Sarcasm" and "Whore". The album is a departure from the band's previous releases, which had more screaming and a dirtier sound to them. This is the band's only album released on Universal Motown.

Overview
Best Kind of Mess is a departure from the band's previous releases, which had more screaming and a dirtier sound to them. Two songs from the Get Scared EP (Voodoo and Sarcasm) were included on the album. Best Kind of Mess was released on July 12, 2011. To promote the album, the band headlined the Fuck You All tour. Dr. Acula and Girl on Fire toured alongside the band.

Track listing

Personnel 
Credits for Best Kind of Mess adapted from AllMusic.

Musicians

Get Scared
Nicholas Matthews – lead vocals
Johnny B – lead guitar, backing vocals
Bradley Lloyd – rhythm guitar, bass, backing vocals
Dan Juarez – drums, percussion

Additional musicians
Craig Mabbitt – guest vocals on "Sarcasm"
John Feldmann – backing vocals, percussion, string arrangements

Production

Aaron Accetta – production, composer
Fred Archambault – audio
John Feldmann – production, additional production, composer, mixing, programming
Seth Foster – mastering
Joe Gastwirt – mastering
Shep Goodman – production, composer
Kevin Griffin – composer
Jon Nicholson – drum technician
Brandon Paddock -
Mikhail Pivovarov – assistant engineer
Steve Poon – guitar technician
Erik Ron – second engineer

Chart positions

Release history

References

2011 debut albums
Albums produced by Aaron Accetta
Albums produced by John Feldmann
Get Scared albums
Universal Motown Records albums